Würznerhorn is a mountain on the border of Liechtenstein and Switzerland in the Rätikon range of the Eastern Alps close to the town of Balzers, with a height of .

See also 
Mittlerspitz
Mittagspitz

References
 

Mountains of the Alps
Mountains of Liechtenstein
Mountains of Switzerland
Mountains of Graubünden
Liechtenstein–Switzerland border
International mountains of Europe
One-thousanders of Switzerland